There are over 20,000 Grade II* listed buildings in England.  This page is a list of the 19 Grade II* listed buildings in the district of Woking in Surrey.  For links to similar articles in relation to the other 10 districts of Surrey see Grade II* listed buildings in Surrey.


|}

Notes

References 
English Heritage Images of England

External links

Woking
 Woking
Woking